The badminton tournaments at the 2020 Summer Olympics in Tokyo took place between 24 July and 2 August 2021. A total of 172 athletes (86 male and 86 female players) competed in five events: men's singles, men's doubles, women's singles, women's doubles, and mixed doubles.

Qualification

The Olympic qualification period was originally scheduled to take place between 29 April 2019 and 26 April 2020, and the Badminton World Federation rankings list, scheduled to publish on 30 April 2020. The Olympic qualification period was then set between 29 April 2019 and 6 June 2021, and the Badminton World Federation rankings list, published on 15 June 2021, was used to allocate spots. Nations were able to enter a maximum of two players each in the men's and women's singles, if both were ranked in the world's top 16; otherwise, one quota place until the roster of thirty-eight players had been completed. Similar regulations also applied to the players competing in the doubles, as the NOCs could enter a maximum of two pairs if both were ranked in the top eight, while the remaining NOC's were entitled to one until the quota of 16 highest-ranked pairs was filled. Additional rules ensured that each continent is represented in every event, guaranteed the host at least one quota place in each individual event, and assign additional quota places if players qualify in multiple events.

Schedule 
The tournament was held over a 10-day period.

Participating nations
A total of 172 badminton players from 49 National Olympic Committees (NOCs) across five continental confederations participate at the 2020 Summer Olympics.

 (host)

Competitors

Medal summary

Medal table

Medalists

Results

Men's singles

Women's singles

Men's doubles

Women's doubles

Mixed doubles

See also
Badminton at the 2018 Asian Games
Badminton at the 2018 Summer Youth Olympics
Badminton at the 2019 African Games
Badminton at the 2019 European Games
Badminton at the 2019 Pan American Games
Badminton at the 2020 Summer Paralympics

References

External links
 Results book 

Badminton at the 2020 Summer Olympics
2020
2020 Summer Olympics events
Summer Olympics
Badminton tournaments in Japan